Deicide is the killing (or the killer) of a god. The concept may be used for any act of killing a god, including a life-death-rebirth deity who is killed and then resurrected.

Etymology
The term deicide was coined in the 17th century from medieval Latin *deicidium, from deus "god" and -cidium "cutting, killing."

Aztec mythology

 Tezcatlipoca tricked his rival Quetzalcoatl into over-drinking and wantonry. Quetzalcoatl burns himself to death in shame.

Buddhism

 The crimes listed in the Anantarika-karma include killing an Arhat and shedding the blood of a Buddha.
 Devadatta and Ajātasattu attempted to kill the Gautama Buddha.

Christianity

According to the New Testament accounts, the Judean authorities in Jerusalem under Roman rule, the Pharisees, charged Jesus with blasphemy, a capital crime under biblical law, and sought his execution. Additionally, John 7:53–8:11 records them asking Jesus about stoning the adulteress and Acts 6:12 records them ordering the stoning of Saint Stephen.

They brought Jesus to Pontius Pilate, the Roman Prefect of Judea, who was hesitant and let the people decide if Jesus were to be executed. According to the Bible, Pontius Pilate only ordered Jesus to be flogged. Washing his hands, Pilate said he would not take the blame for Jesus' death, to which the crowd replied, "His blood is upon us and our children."

Pilate is portrayed in the Gospel accounts as a reluctant accomplice to Jesus' death. Modern scholars say it is most likely that a Roman Governor such as Pilate would have no problem in executing any leader whose followers posed a potential threat to Roman rule. It has also been suggested that the Gospel accounts may have downplayed the role of the Romans in Jesus' death during a time when Christianity was struggling to gain acceptance in the Roman world.

Analysis

The Catholic Church and other Christian denominations suggest that Jesus' death was necessary to take away the collective sin of the human race. The crucifixion is seen as an example of Christ's eternal love for mankind and as a self-sacrifice on the part of God for humanity.

The Gnostic Gospel of Judas contends that Jesus commanded Judas Iscariot to set in motion the chain of events that would lead to his death.

Against certain Christian movements, some of which rejected the use of Hebrew Scripture, Augustine countered that God had chosen the Jews as a special people, and he considered the scattering of Jewish people by the Roman Empire to be a fulfillment of prophecy. He rejected homicidal attitudes, quoting part of the same prophecy, namely "Slay them not, lest they should at last forget Thy law" (Psalm 59:11). Augustine, who believed Jewish people would be converted to Christianity at "the end of time", argued that God had allowed them to survive their dispersion as a warning to Christians; as such, he argued, they should be permitted to dwell in Christian lands. The sentiment sometimes attributed to Augustine that Christians should let the Jews "survive but not thrive" (it is repeated by author James Carroll in his book Constantine's Sword, for example) is apocryphal and is not found in any of his writings. Nietzsche's later statement, God is dead, was seen as a form of deicide.

Egyptian mythology

Set killed Osiris, who was later resurrected by Isis. In Greek sources, Typhon replaces Set as the murderer.

Greek mythology

Ophiotaurus was a creature whose entrails were said to grant the power to defeat the gods to whoever burned them. The Titans attempted to use them against the Olympians. After learning that his children were destined to usurp him, Cronus devoured his children. However, his children were later freed by Zeus.

Hawaiian mythology

 Lanikaula, a prophet, kills the followers of the trickster god Pahulu on Lanai.

Japanese mythology

 Izanami died while giving birth to the fire god Kagutsuchi.
 Kagutsuchi's father, Izanagi, beheaded Kagutsuchi out of grief.

Mesopotamian mythology

In Babylonian mythology, Kingu, along with his dragon mother, Tiamat, were slain by the war-god Marduk in the primordial battle of the Enuma Elish. Afterward, the gods mixed Kingu's blood with clay and created humans. A variant of this myth, from the Atra-Hasis epic, says that the minor god Geshtu-E was sacrificed to make humans with his blood.

Norse mythology

 Loki tricked Höðr into killing Baldr.
 Váli avenged Baldr's death by killing Höðr.
 Most of the major figures die in Ragnarök. According to the Gylfaginning, Jörmungandr kills Thor by poisoning him, Fenrir kills Odin, while Heimdall and Loki kill each other.

Video games
Gods are sometimes used as extremely powerful enemies in video games, often as the final boss. Many of these games make deicide the central goal of the game, the destruction of an evil god who has been supporting the antagonists or tormenting the protagonist, or use a forgotten god as a Lovecraftian horror who has been reawakened to wreak havoc on the world. In other games, a villain seizes the power of the gods, ascending to godhood themselves, forcing the player to kill them in their newly empowered form.
 In the God of War series, Kratos repeatedly commits deicide. He is initially assigned to kill Ares, the titular God of War, and does so at the climax of the first game, resulting in Kratos ascending to godhood himself as the new god of war. Subsequent games feature Kratos going to war with the rest of the Greek pantheon, as well as the Titans, eventually culminating in Kratos killing all the other gods before leaving. The second saga of the series features Kratos with the Norse gods, with the first game resulting in Kratos killing Baldur.
 In Final Fantasy VI, Kefka, the primary antagonist of the game, drains the magic of the gods of magic, ascending to godhood himself prior to the climactic final showdown.
 Smite is a MOBA centered around playing as a god, while fighting other gods.
 The Megami Tensei franchise has many characters committing deicide, with the most prominent example being Shin Megami Tensei IV: Apocalypse, where the main character, Nanashi, is reincarnated shortly after his death by Dagda who plans to make him his "godslayer".

See also
 Death of God theology
 Death or departure of the gods
 Dying-and-rising deity
 God is dead
 Ragnarök
 Theomachy

References

External links
 

17th-century neologisms
Christian anti-Judaism
Christian terminology
Christianity and antisemitism
Death of deities
Religious philosophical concepts
Killings by type